Kosmos 242 ( meaning Cosmos 242), also known as DS-P1-I No.4 was a satellite which was used as a radar target for anti-ballistic missile tests. It was launched by the Soviet Union in 1968 as part of the Dnepropetrovsk Sputnik programme.

It was launched aboard a Kosmos-2I 63SM rocket, from Site 133/1 at Plesetsk. The launch occurred at 14:39:59 UTC on 20 September 1968.

It decayed from orbit on 13 November 1968.

Kosmos 242 was the fourth of nineteen DS-P1-I satellites to be launched. Of these, all reached orbit successfully except the seventh.

See also

1968 in spaceflight

References

Spacecraft launched in 1968
Kosmos 0242
1968 in the Soviet Union
Dnepropetrovsk Sputnik program